Patricia Black is an American actress living in New York, where she has studied acting since 2007. In 2013, she played a supporting role in Nadia Szold's debut film, Joy de V..

Filmography
 Ryan Murphy's Pose Season 2 (2019)
 Dead Aim (1987)
 The Persian Love Cake (2009)
 A New York Fairy Tale (2011)
 Joy de V. (2013)
 The Last American Guido (2014)
 The Cocks of the Walk (2014)

External links

References

Living people
American film actresses
Actresses from New York City
1956 births
21st-century American women